Pseudomacrochenus spinicollis is a species of beetle in the family Cerambycidae. It was described by Stephan von Breuning in 1949. It is known from Laos, China and Myanmar.

References

Lamiini
Beetles described in 1949
Taxa named by Stephan von Breuning (entomologist)